Guillermo Flavier Pablo (June 25, 1886 – August 2, 1982) was a Filipino jurist and politician who served as an Associate Justice of the Supreme Court from 1945 to 1955. He had earlier served as a member of the House of Representatives of the Philippines, representing the Lone District of Zambales from 1916 to 1922.

Profile

Pablo was born in San Antonio, Zambales. He earned his law degree from the Escuela de Derecho de Manila (now Manila Law College) and was admitted to the Philippine bar on October 8, 1908.  Before his admission to the bar, Pablo worked as a journalist for several newspapers, including the La Independencia, the official daily of the Partido Independencia.

Pablo was appointed acting provincial fiscal of Zambales in 1915. The following year, he was elected as a representative from Zambales to the Philippine Assembly, winning re-election in 1919. Pablo's second term in the House expired in 1922.

In 1924, Pablo was appointed an auxiliary judge, and later a district judge, in Cebu. He was then named to the Court of First Instance of Nueva Ecija in 1938. In 1945, he was appointed by President Sergio Osmena to the Court of First Instance of Rizal and Bataan.

In June 1945, President Osmena named Pablo to the Supreme Court as an Associate Justice. Justice Pablo was one of the last Philippine Supreme Court Justices to author his opinions in the Spanish language. One of his most notable opinions for the Court was in Moncado v. People's Court (1948), which declined to adopt the exclusionary rule in the Philippines; the exclusionary rule would later be adopted by the Supreme Court in Stonehill v. Diokno (1967), which explicitly abandoned Moncado.

Justice Pablo retired from the Supreme Court in 1955. He died in Marikina on August 2, 1982.

References

Notes

20th-century Filipino judges
Spanish-language writers of the Philippines
1886 births
1982 deaths
People from Zambales
Associate Justices of the Supreme Court of the Philippines
Members of the House of Representatives of the Philippines from Zambales